Gerald D. "Red" Armstrong (1903 – May 7, 1978) was an American football and basketball player and coach. He served as the head football coach at Denison University in Granville, Ohio from 1942 to 1944, compiling a record of 12–3–2. Denison did not field a football team in 1943. Armstrong was also the head basketball coach at Denison during the 1943–44 season, tallying a mark of 18–2. In 1944, he resigned from coaching to enter into private business in Newark, Ohio. He died at Licking Memorial Hospital, in Newark, on May 7, 1978.

Head coaching record

College football

References

External links
 

1903 births
1978 deaths
American men's basketball players
Denison Big Red football coaches
Denison Big Red men's basketball coaches
Wittenberg Tigers football players
Wittenberg Tigers men's basketball players
High school football coaches in Ohio